This page serves as an index of lists of kings of the Gaelic kingdoms of Ireland of the Early Medieval period.

List of High Kings of Ireland
Kings of Ailech
Kings of Airgíalla
Kings of Brega
Kings of Breifne
Kings of Connacht
Kings of Dál nAraidi
Kings of Dál Riata
Kings of Déisi Muman
Kings of Desmond
Kings of Dublin
Kings of East Breifne
Kings of Fer Manach
Kings of Leinster
Kings of Magh Luirg
Kings of Mide
Kings of Munster
Kings of Osraige
Kings of Síol Anmchadha
Kings of Tara
Kings of Thomond
Kings of Tír Chonaill
Kings of Tír Eoghain
Kings of Uí Cheinnselaig
Kings of Uí Failghe
Kings of Uí Maine
Kings of Uisnech
Kings of Ulster
Kings of West Breifne

See also
Monarchy of Ireland

kings
kings
kings